Rolf Müller may refer to:

 Rolf-Dieter Müller (born 1948), German historian
 Rolf Müller (molecular biologist) (born 1953), German biochemist
 Rolf Müller (bobsleigh) (born 1961), German bobsledder
 Rolf Müller (canoeist), German slalom canoer
 Rolf Müller (designer) (1940–2015), German graphic designer